Anthony Michael Vincent Coombs (born 18 November 1952) is a Conservative Party politician in the United Kingdom and a company director.

Early life
Coombs was educated at Charterhouse School and Worcester College, Oxford.

Political career
Coombs was a Councillor on the Birmingham City Council between 1978 and 1988. He contested Coventry North West in the 1983 General Election, but was defeated by incumbent Labour MP Geoffrey Robinson.

Coombs was MP for Wyre Forest from 1987 until 1997 when he lost the seat to Labour's David Lock. During his time as an MP he was a Parliamentary Private Secretary to David Mellor. He served as an assistant government whip from 1996 to 1997.

Later career
He has been chairman of S&U Plc (a UK consumer and motor finance provider) since July 2008.  He has served as a director of a number of companies and charities including the Birmingham Royal Ballet Trust Board. Coombs also serves on the Public Relations Committee of the Consumer Credit Association.

References

Times Guide to the House of Commons 1997

External links 

S&U Plc website
Birmingham Royal Ballet website

1952 births
Living people
People educated at Charterhouse School
Conservative Party (UK) MPs for English constituencies
Members of the Bow Group
UK MPs 1987–1992
UK MPs 1992–1997